Pilgrim Airlines Flight 458 was a scheduled United States passenger air commuter flight from LaGuardia Airport in New York City to Logan Airport in Boston, Massachusetts, with stopovers in Bridgeport, New Haven, and Groton, Connecticut.  On February 21, 1982, the de Havilland Canada DHC-6-100 operating the flight made a forced landing on the frozen Scituate Reservoir near Providence, Rhode Island after a fire erupted in the cockpit and cabin due to leakage of flammable windshield washer/deicer fluid.  One passenger was unable to escape the aircraft and died of smoke inhalation, and eight of the remaining nine passengers, as well as both crew members, received serious injuries from the fire and crash-landing.

Accident
The three legs of the flight from LaGuardia to Groton were uneventful. At Groton, the flightcrew who had flown the first three legs handed off the aircraft to the flightcrew for the final Groton-Boston leg, and flight 458 took off from Groton at 1510 Eastern Standard Time. About 15 minutes later, while flying over northwestern Rhode Island, first officer Lyle Hogg, observing light icing on the windshield, activated the windshield washer/deicer system twice, to little apparent effect; during the second deicing attempt, Hogg smelled alcohol, which prompted him to stop the deicing. Shortly afterwards, smoke started entering the cockpit around the base of the control column. Captain Thomas Prinster contacted air traffic control, declared an emergency, and requested and received radar vectors direct to T. F. Green Airport for an emergency landing; the airport's ARFF crews were called up to assist the aircraft upon its arrival. The heat of the fire melted the flightcrew's audio headsets, forcing them to be discarded. During the emergency descent, one of the two passengers who attempted to fight the cabin fire, off-duty USAir flight engineer Harry Polychron, used a tennis racket to break cabin windows to try and clear smoke from the passenger cabin.

The flightcrew and nine of the ten passengers managed to evacuate the burning aircraft and walk to shore (the tenth, a 59-year-old woman with severe chronic obstructive pulmonary disease and marked atherosclerosis, was overcome by smoke and toxic gas before she could escape). Of the eleven survivors, all but one sustained serious injuries in the accident; most of the passengers received blunt-force injuries of varying severity in the hard landing, the flightcrew and two passengers were burned by the inflight fire (Captain Prinster received second-to-third-degree burns over 50 to 70 percent of his body surface and spent months in hospital, but ultimately survived; First Officer Hogg, although also suffering second-to-third-degree burns, was burned less extensively, due both to his wearing thicker clothing and to the fire being concentrated on the left side of the aircraft; and the two burned passengers sustained first-and-second-degree burns to their hands and arms), and all of the survivors suffered from smoke inhalation. The aircraft's fuselage was almost completely destroyed by fire after the landing, with the only surviving parts of the passenger cabin being the stainless-steel seat frames and melted lower-fuselage structure.

Investigation and aftermath
Due to the fire breaking out immediately after the attempts to deice the windshield, the alcohol smell detected by the first officer just before the smoke started to appear, and the liquid, flowing nature of the fire in the passenger cabin, the National Transportation Safety Board (NTSB)'s investigation focused on the windshield washer/deicer system. The accident aircraft's washer/deicer had a history of leakage resulting from the Tygon tubing's incompatibility with isopropyl alcohol, exposure to which caused the ends of the tubing to become hardened and misshapen; the degraded tubing ends no longer fit tightly to their attachment points, and could sometimes separate completely. To fix this leakage, maintenance personnel had to periodically cut off the hardened, misshapen ends of the tubing and reattach the newly-shortened tubing (eventually shortening the tubing enough to require that more tubing be spliced on in order for the tubing to reach its attachment points without stretching). The procedures used by Pilgrim Airlines (and approved by de Havilland) at the time of the accident allowed the tubing to be secured to its attachment points by wrapping the connections with safety wire, and did not require the use of a clamp to hold the connection in place.

Several months prior to the accident, while on the ground at LaGuardia, the tubing on the accident aircraft's washer/deicer system was found to have separated from the pump outlet; this occurred again just three days before the accident, when a pilot observed alcohol leaking from the pump outlet fitting, from which the tubing had separated, during a stopover in New Haven. The washer/deicer was repaired later that day, but the methods routinely used to secure the Tygon tubing did not positively ensure that it would stay attached to the pump and reservoir. Postaccident testing using an exemplar pump, reservoir, and tubing showed that, with the pump outlet disconnected from its tubing, a slow leak from the pump would occur even with the pump not operating. The NTSB considered the alcohol washer/deicer system to pose a serious fire hazard, and recommended its removal from the DHC-6s which used it; the Federal Aviation Administration agreed, and issued an Airworthiness Directive in December 1982 which prohibited the system from being used for deicing past November 30, 1983 (eliminating the use of highly-flammable isopropyl alcohol in the system) and required the installation of an electrically-heated windshield for DHC-6s certified to be flown in icing conditions after that date.

For their work in flying the aircraft to a successful landing despite the extremely hostile cockpit environment, and thereby saving the lives of nearly everyone on board, Captain Prinster and First Officer Hogg were jointly awarded the Flight Safety Foundation's Heroism Award for 1982.  Additionally, a public park in Scituate was named after, and dedicated to, the pilots of Flight 458.  Both pilots eventually returned to flying with Pilgrim Airlines, although for Prinster this lasted only briefly before he retired from commercial aviation; he died in 2018 due to lingering complications of lung damage from the Flight 458 fire.  Hogg moved to US Airways in 1984 and eventually became that airline's vice president of flight operations, before serving as president and CEO of Piedmont Airlines from 2015 through 2020.  In November 2019, Prinster and Hogg were both inducted into the Rhode Island Aviation Hall of Fame (Prinster posthumously) for their heroic actions.

Notes

References

External links
 NTSB accident report (summary, PDF)
 Accident description at the Aviation Safety Network (archive)

Airliner accidents and incidents caused by in-flight fires
Aviation accidents and incidents in 1982
Airliner accidents and incidents in Rhode Island
Accidents and incidents involving the de Havilland Canada DHC-6 Twin Otter
1982 in Rhode Island
February 1982 events in the United States